The name Čardak might refer to various settlements in the former Yugoslavia:

Bosnia and Herzegovina
 Čardak (Modriča), a village close to Modriča
 Čardak, Zavidovići, a village close to Zavidovići

Montenegro
 Čardak, Pljevlja, a village near Pljevlja

Serbia
 Čardak, Sremska Kamenica, a neighborhood of Sremska Kamenica, Serbia
 Čardak, Kovin, a former vacation settlement and refugee camp in Serbia

Slovenia
 Čardak, Črnomelj, a settlement in Črnomelj Municipality, Slovenia

See also 
 Çardak (disambiguation)